Trauma (formerly Thanatos) is a Polish death metal band formed in 1986 in Elblag. Trauma has ranked among the top bands in the Polish death metal scene.

Members
Current line-up
Arkadiusz "Mały" Sinica – drums  
Jarosław "Mister" Misterkiewicz – guitars 
Artur "Chudy" Chudewniak – vocals

 Former members
Piotr Zienkiewicz – bass, vocals
Jacek "Skocz" Holewa – vocals
Arkadiusz Furdal – guitars
Paweł Kapla – bass
Paweł "Firana" Krajnik – bass
Patryk "Patrix" Krajnik – guitars, vocals
Filip "Fill" Musiatowicz – guitars
Robert "Kopeć" Jarymowicz – vocals
Dawid "Davidian" Rutkowski – bass
Andrzej "Wasyl" Wasiukiewicz – drums
Zbigniew Kunicki – guitars
Wojciech "Bubi" Sukow – bass, vocals
Bartek "Winiar" Winiarski – vocals

 Current live members
Tomek Myśliński – bass
Krzysztof "Dziadek" Dobrowolski – bass, guitars
 Former live members 
Paweł "Pery" Perwejnis – bass
Przemysław Ozga – guitars
Konrad Rossa – guitars
Krystian "Dino" Wojdas – guitars

Discography

As Thanatos
 Deo Optimo Maximo (DEMO) - 1989
 Out of Sanity (DEMO) - 1990

As Trauma
 Invisible Reality (DEMO) - 1992
 Comedy Is Over - 1996
 Daimonion - 1998
 Suffocated In Slumber - 2000
 Crash Test (LIVE) - 2001
 Imperfect Like A God - 2003
 Determination - 2005
 Hamartia (EP) - 2006
 Neurotic Mass - 2007
 Archetype of Chaos  - 2010
 Karma Obscura - 2013
 Ominous Black - 2020

References

Sources
 https://web.archive.org/web/20100725072343/http://www.trauma.art.pl/index.php/en
 http://www.metalstorm.net/bands/band.php?band_id=1193&bandname=Trauma

External links

Polish death metal musical groups
Polish musical trios